The 1912 Denver Pioneers football team represented the University of Denver as a member of the Rocky Mountain Conference (RMC) during the 1912 college football season. In their first and only season under head coach Clem Crowley, the Pioneers compiled a 2–6–1 record (1–3 against conference opponents), finished sixth in the RMC, and were outscored by a total of 130 to 87.

Schedule

References

Denver
Denver Pioneers football seasons
Denver Pioneers football